The 45th Pennsylvania Volunteer Infantry was an infantry regiment that served in the Union Army during the American Civil War.

Service
The 45th Pennsylvania Infantry was organized beginning July 28, 1861 and mustered in October 21, 1861 at Camp Curtin in Harrisburg, Pennsylvania for a three-year enlistment under the command of Colonel Thomas Welsh.

The regiment was attached to Jamison's Brigade, Heintzelman's Division, Army of the Potomac, to October 1861. Unattached, Sherman's South Carolina Expeditionary Corps, to April 1862. 2nd Brigade, 1st Division, Department of the South, to July 1862. 2nd Brigade, 1st Division, IX Corps, Army of the Potomac, to September 1862. 3rd Brigade, 1st Division, IX Corps, Army of the Potomac, to April 1863, and Army of the Ohio to June 1863. 1st Brigade, 1st Division, IX Corps, Army of the Tennessee, to August 1863, and Army of the Ohio to April 1864. 1st Brigade, 2nd Division, IX Corps, Army of the Potomac, to July 1865.

The 45th Pennsylvania Infantry mustered out July 17, 1865.

Detailed service

The 73rd OVI's detailed service is as follows (NOTE — Battles are Bolded, Italicized; campaigns are Italicized):

1861
 Moved to Washington, D.C., October 21–23
 Expedition into lower Maryland November 3–11, 1861
 Moved to Baltimore, Md., then to Fort Monroe, Va., November 19–21
 Sailed for Port Royal, S.C., December 6–8
 Companies A, C, D, E, and I assigned to duty at Bay Point; Companies B, F, G, H, and K occupied Otter Island, S.C., December 11, and duty there until May 1862; Companies F and K occupied Fenwick Island December 20, 1861; Company F at Fenwick Island April 4 to May 20, 1862; Companies B, F, G, H, I, and K moved to North Edisto Island, S.C., May 21, 1862

1862
 Operations against James Island, SC, May 21-June 28
 Action on James Island June 10. 
 Battle of Secessionville June 16
 Evacuation of James Island and movement to Hilton Head June 28-July 1
 Moved to Newport News, Va., July 18–21, then to Aquia Creek August 4–5
 Operations on the Rapidan and Rappahannock Rivers until September
 At Brook's Station August 5–29
 Destruction of bridges at Potomac Creek and Brook's Station September 4
 Destruction of stores at Aquia Creek September 6
 Battle of South Mountain September 14
 Battle of Antietam September 16–17
 Duty at Pleasant Valley, Md., until October 26
 Marched to Lovettsville, Va., October 26–29; then to Warrenton October 29-November 19
 Battle of Fredericksburg December 12–15

1863
 Burnside's Mud March January 20–24, 1863
 At Falmouth until February 11
 Moved to Newport News February 11, then to Lexington, Ky., March 19–23
 Duty at various points in Kentucky until June
 Moved to Vicksburg, Miss., June 7–14
 Siege of Vicksburg June 14-July 4
 Advance on Jackson, Miss., July 5–10
 Siege of Jackson July 10–17
 At Milldale until August 5
 Moved to Covington, Ky., then to Crab Orchard August 5–18
 Burnside's Campaign in eastern Tennessee August 16-October 17
 Blue Springs October 10
 Knoxville Campaign November 4-December 23
 Lenoir Station November 14–15
 Campbell's Station November 16
 Siege of Knoxville November 17-December 4
 Pursuit of Longstreet December 5–24

1864
 Regiment reenlisted January 1, 1864
 Operations in eastern Tennessee until March 1864
 Strawberry Plains January 21–22
 Movement to Annapolis, Md., March 21-April 6
 Overland Campaign May 4-June 12
 Battle of the Wilderness May 5–7; 
 Spotsylvania May 8–12; 
 Spotsylvania Court House May 12–21
 Assault on the Salient May 12
 Stannard's Mill May 21
 North Anna River May 23–26
 Line of the Pamunkey May 26–28
 Totopotomoy May 28–31
 Cold Harbor June 1–12
 Bethesda Church June 1–3
 Before Petersburg June 16–18
 Siege of Petersburg June 16, 1864 to April 2, 1865
 Battle of the Crater, Petersburg, July 30, 1864
 Second Battle of Weldon Railroad August 18–21
 Poplar Springs Church September 29-October 2
 Peeble's Farm October 1
 Boydton Plank Road, Hatcher's Run, October 27–28
 At Fort Rice until April 1865

1865
 Fort Stedman March 25, 1865
 Assault on and fall of Petersburg April 2
 Marched to Farmville April 3–9
 Moved to Petersburg and City Point April 20–24, then to Alexandria April 26–28
 Grand Review of the Armies May 23
 Duty at Washington and Alexandria until July

Casualties
The regiment lost a total of 479 men during service; 13 officers and 214 enlisted men killed or mortally wounded, 252 enlisted men died of disease.

Commanders
 Colonel Thomas Welsh - promoted to brigadier general March 1, 1863
 Colonel John I. Curtin
 Lieutenant Colonel Francis M. Hills - commanded during the Knoxville Campaign
 Captain Theodore Gregg - commanded during the Battle of the Crater

Notable members
 Captain Rees G. Richards, Company G — 16th Lieutenant Governor of Ohio, 1882-1884
 Corporal Franklin Hogan, Company A —  Capture of flag of 6th Virginia Infantry (C.S.A.)  Second Petersburg, 30 July 1864

See also
 List of Pennsylvania Civil War Units
 Pennsylvania in the Civil War

Notes

References

External links
 45th Pennsylvania monument at Antietam Battlefield
 NPS, Battle Unit Details: 45th Regiment, Pennsylvania Infantry
 FamilySearch: 45th Regiment, Pennsylvania Infantry
 Civil War Index: 45th Pennsylvania Infantry in the Civil War
 The Civil War in the East: 45th Pennsylvania Volunteer Infantry Regiment

Military units and formations established in 1861
Military units and formations disestablished in 1865
Units and formations of the Union Army from Pennsylvania